Fox (known by a variety of different names, including Mesquakie (Meskwaki), Mesquakie-Sauk, Mesquakie-Sauk-Kickapoo, Sauk-Fox, and Sac and Fox) is an Algonquian language, spoken by a thousand Meskwaki, Sauk, and Kickapoo in various locations in the Midwestern United States and in northern Mexico.

Dialects 

The three distinct dialects are: 
 Kickapoo (also rendered ; considered by some to be a closely related but distinct language). 

If Kickapoo is counted as a separate language rather than a dialect of Fox, then only between 200 and 300 speakers of Fox remain.  Extinct Mascouten was most likely another dialect, though it is scarcely attested.

Revitalization 
Most speakers are elderly or middle-aged, making it highly endangered. The tribal school at the Meskwaki Settlement in Iowa incorporates bilingual education for children. In 2011, the Meskwaki Sewing Project was created, to bring mothers and girls together "with elder women in the Meskwaki Senior Center sewing traditional clothing and learning the Meskwaki language."

Prominent scholars doing research on the language include Ives Goddard and Lucy Thomason of the Smithsonian Institution and Amy Dahlstrom of the University of Chicago.

Phonology

The consonant phonemes of Fox are given in the table below. The eight vowel phonemes are: short  and long .

Until the early 1900s, Fox was a phonologically very conservative language and preserved many features of Proto-Algonquian; records from the decades immediately following 1900 are particularly useful to Algonquianists for this reason. By the 1960s, however, an extensive progression of phonological changes had taken place, resulting in the loss of intervocalic semivowels and certain other features.

Grammar

Vocabulary
Mesquakie numerals are as follows:

Writing systems

Besides the Latin script, Fox has been written in two indigenous scripts.

"Fox I" is an abugida based on the cursive French alphabet (see Great Lakes Algonquian syllabics). Consonants written by themselves are understood to be syllables containing the vowel . They are l , t , s , d , tt , I , w , m , n , K , q .

Vowels are written by adding dots to the consonant: l. , l· , l.. .

Consonants are (approximately) + , C , Q , ı , ñ , ═ , ƧƧ , 田 , # , C′ , ƧC .

See also

Sac and Fox Nation
Sauk language
Kickapoo language
Kickapoo whistled speech

References

Bloomfield, Leonard. 1925. "Notes on the Fox Language." International Journal of American Linguistics 3:219-32.

Cowan, William 1991. "Observations Regarding Fox (Mesquakie) Phonology". Papers of the Twenty-Second Algonquian Conference.
Dahlstrom, Amy. (N.d.). Meskwaki Syntax (Manuscript). Retrieved from https://lucian.uchicago.edu/blogs/adahlstrom/publications-2/selected-manuscripts/meskwaki-syntax-book
Voorhis, Paul H. 1974.  Introduction to the Kickapoo Language, Bloomington: Indiana University Press.

External links
Native Languages of the Americas: Mesquakie-Sauk
Fox texts (1907), ed. William Jones
The Owl Sacred Pack of the Fox Indians (1921), ed. Truman Michelson
The Autobiography of a Fox Indian Woman (1895), ed. Truman Michelson

Meskwaki Language - Alphabet
OLAC resources in and about the Meskwaki language
OLAC resources in and about the Kickapoo language
A Concise Dictionary of the Sauk Language  , 2005, Gordon Whittaker, The Sac & Fox National Public Library, Stroud, Oklahoma

Algonquian languages
 
Native American language revitalization
Indigenous languages of the North American eastern woodlands
Indigenous languages of the North American Plains
Indigenous languages of Oklahoma
Endangered Algic languages
Articles citing INALI
Endangered indigenous languages of the Americas
Kickapoo